Chehel Zari-ye Ajam (also Romanized as Chehel Zar‘ī-ye ‘Ajam and Chehel Zar‘ī ‘Ajam; also known as ‘Ajam and Chehil Gazi) is a village in Shabankareh Rural District, Shabankareh District, Dashtestan County, Bushehr Province, Iran. At the 2006 census, its population was 513, in 117 families.

References 

Populated places in Dashtestan County